Eastview Secondary School is a public secondary school (grades 9-12) located in northeastern Barrie, Ontario, Canada. It has an enrollment of about 1,400 students. 
 
Eastview is one of the largest high schools in Barrie, Ontario, serving students from the east end of Barrie, as well as the south portion of Oro-Medonte Township (Horseshoe Valley, Shanty Bay, Crown Hill). It has a string-music program, making it unique in the county. The mascot of the school is a Wildcat.

Computing History

Built in 1967, Eastview was equipped with the first student accessible mainframe computer in Simcoe County. The General Electric GE-115 was equipped with 12K of magnetic-core memory and a hard disk drive with a removable disk pack. The GE-115 computer was housed in a climate controlled room and operated by students. Students at Eastview could use punched card decks to submit FORTRAN and COBOL programs to be run by the student operators. Other high schools sent in their programs encoded on mark sense cards and would receive the output bundled around their cards after their jobs were submitted. With the advent of the microcomputer in the late 1970s, Eastview computer curriculum grew to include courses based on the Tandy Corporation TRS-80 and Commodore PET using the computer language, BASIC. In 1981, the GE-115 mainframe computer was dismantled and shipped to the Canada Science and Technology Museum.

Notable alumni
 Mike Hoffman (ice hockey, born 1963), NHL player

See also
List of high schools in Ontario

References

External links
Eastview Secondary School

High schools in Barrie
Educational institutions in Canada with year of establishment missing